Arunraja Kamaraj is an Indian singer, lyricist, actor and director in Tamil-language films. He is known for his works as lyricist in films such as Jigarthanda, Theri, Pencil and Kabali. He also debuted as an actor in Raja Rani and appeared as Neruppu Kumar in the film Maan Karate. He has written and sung the song "Ding Dong" for the movie Jigarthanda, which was critically acclaimed. He has also written and sung the song "Neruppu Da" in Rajinikanth's film Kabali. His other notable works includes movies such as Demonte Colony and Trisha Illana Nayanthara.

Life 
Arunraja Kamaraj was born in Parali near Kulithalai town in Tamil Nadu. Studied schoolings at Government Boys Higher Secondary School, Kulithalai and higher secondary schoolings at Bishop Heber Higher Secondary School, Trichy. He graduated from J. J. College of Engineering and Technology, Tiruchirappalli. One of his college mates was actor Sivakarthikeyan. He is an excellent cricketer, during his college days, he represented JJCET as an all-rounder and won many university trophies and cups, he is nicknamed as Tikolo by the teammates in reference to the Kenyan cricket captain Steve Tikolo. He worked as an assistant director in Nelson Dilipkumar's Kolamaavu Kokila. Later, he went on to name a character in his movie Kanaa after Nelson Dilipkumar which was played by Sivakarthikeyan.

Personal life 
Arunraja Kamaraj was married to Sindhuja, who died of COVID-19 in 2021. They had two daughters together. Arunraja Kamaraj remarried in late 2022.

Filmography
As director and writer

As actor

As lyricist

As singer

Awards and recognitions
 BOFTA Galatta Debutant Awards 2019 - Best Debut Director (People Choice)
 Colors Tamil Galatta Nakshatra Awards 2019 - Online Musical Sensation
 JFW Movie Awards 2019 - Best Director for Kanaa
 Norway Tamil Film Festival Awards 2019 - Best Social Awareness Award for Kanaa (as director)
 Zee Cine Awards Tamil 2020 - Best Debut Director for Kanaa

References

External links
 

Living people
Male actors from Tamil Nadu
Tamil film poets
Tamil comedians
Indian male singers
Indian male playback singers
Tamil singers
Tamil playback singers
Male actors in Tamil cinema
People from Karur district
Singers from Tamil Nadu
Indian male comedians
Indian male film actors
21st-century Indian male actors
1984 births